Kotor Varoš is a town and municipality located in north-western Republika Srpska, an entity of Bosnia and Herzegovina. As of 2013 census, it has a population of 19,710 inhabitants, while the town of Kotor Varoš has a population of 7,330 inhabitants.

History
An early Roman (3rd–5th c.) basilica was discovered along with other Roman findings in the Šiprage area at the Crkvenica-Vrbanja river mouth. 12th-century stećci testify medieval settlement. The original location of stećci was the Crkvenica-Vrbanja, from where they were removed and built into walls of the surrounding buildings (possibly due to the beliefs of their miraculous properties). One of the best preserved stećak is submerged in Vrbanja.

It has been theorized that Kotor Varoš was mentioned in the De Administrando Imperio as "Katera", a part of the "land of Bosnia".

The town was part of the Donji Kraji province of the Banate of Bosnia in the 13th century, and the Kingdom in the 14th and 15th century. The Kotor fortress and its podgrađe was the property of the Hrvatinić noble family.

Austro-Hungarian rule in Bosnia and Herzegovina began in 1878 and ended with the establishment of the Kingdom of Serbs, Croats and Slovenes in 1918, later renamed Kingdom of Yugoslavia. The town was part of the Vrbas Banovina (1929–41), while after World War II it became part of the Socialist Republic of Bosnia and Herzegovina, a republic of Yugoslavia.

Settlements
Aside from the town of Kotor Varoš, the municipality includes the following settlements:

 Baština
 Bilice
 Boljanići
 Borci Donji
 Borci Gornji
 Ćorkovići
 Duratovci
 Garići
 Grabovica
 Hadrovci
 Hrvaćani
 Hanifići
 Jakotina
 Kruševo Brdo
 Liplje
 Maljeva
 Maslovare
 Obodnik
 Orahova
 Palivuk
 Plitska
 Podbrđe
 Podosoje
 Postoje
 Prisočka
 Radohova
 Ravne
 Selačka
 Sokoline
 Stopan
 Šibovi
 Šiprage
 Tovladić
 Vagani
 Varjače
 Večići
 Viševice
 Vranić
 Vrbanjci
 Zabrđe
 Zaselje

Demographics

Population

Ethnic composition

Economy
The following table gives a preview of total number of registered employed people per their core activity (as of 2016):

Famous people
Croatian footballer Mateo Kovačić's parents are from here

Features
The city also features a large monument to the local partisans who died for Yugoslavia during the fighting with the German and Ustaša forces during WW2.

Sister cities
 Kranj, Slovenia
 Herceg Novi, Montenegro
 Kraljevo, Serbia

Gallery

References

Sources

Vojnogeografski institut, Izd. (1955): Prnjavor (List karte 1:100.000, Izohipse na 20 m). Vojnogeografski institut, Beograd.
Spahić M. et al. (2000): Bosna i Hercegovina (1:250.000). Izdavačko preduzeće "Sejtarija", Sarajevo.
Mučibabić  B., Ur. (1998): Geografski atlas Bosne i Hercegovine. Geodetski zavod BiH, Sarajevo.

 
Cities and towns in Republika Srpska
Populated places in Kotor Varoš